A holy water sprinkler can be:
 an aspergillum, a tool used to sprinkle holy water
 the holy water sprinkler (flail weapon), a medieval flail weapon